Anger réti SFAC 1900 SE is a Hungarian football club from the town of Sopron.

History
Under the name EMDSZ Soproni LC, Anger réti SFAC debuted in the 1993–94 season of the Hungarian League and finished fourteenth.

Name Changes
 1900–1908: Soproni FC
 1908–1930: Soproni Football és Athletikai Club
 1930–1932: Soproni Football Club 1900
 1932–1949: Soproni Football és Athletikai Club
 1949–1950: Soproni Szakmaközi SFAC
 1950–1951: Soproni Dolgozók Sport Egylete
 1951–1957: Soproni Vörös Lobogó Selyemipar
 1957–1978: Soproni FAC
 1978–1991: Soproni SE
 1991–1992: Soproni LC
 1992–1996: EMDSZ-Soproni Labdarúgó Club
 1996–1998: Soproni Futball és Atlétikai Club
 1998–1999: Soproni Dreher FAC
 1999–2006: Soproni FAC
 2006–2017: Anger réti SFAC 1900 Sport Egyesület
 2017–    : Soproni FAC 1900 Sport Egyesület

References

External links
 

Football clubs in Hungary
Association football clubs established in 1900
1900 establishments in Hungary